13 is the first compilation album by American rock band the Doors, released by Elektra Records on November 30, 1970. The title refers to the thirteen tracks included, which feature a variety of songs from their five studio albums released up to that point and the cover shrinkwrap originally featured a clear sticker that read: "A Collection of Thirteen Classic Doors Songs". It is the band's only compilation album released while lead singer Jim Morrison was alive.

The album reached No. 25 on the Billboard 200. It has been superseded by later Doors compilations, such as the highly successful The Best of the Doors (1985), and has not been reissued on CD.

Background
13 was a project instigated by Elektra Records, who wanted product from the band for the Christmas season, to which the band reluctantly agreed. Morrison even agreed to shave off his beard for the album cover's photo shoot, but the label opted for a younger photo of the singer, which they had also done for the group's live album Absolutely Live, released in July of that year. As author Danny Sugerman observed in his memoir of the band, No One Here Gets Out Alive, "Elektra obviously wanted the 'pretty' Jim Morrison." Morrison's image is also much larger than those of guitarist Robby Krieger, keyboardist Ray Manzarek, and drummer John Densmore, and Sugerman noted that, "Although Ray, Robby, and John had become accustomed to the attention directed towards their lead singer, it upset Jim." The album's back cover features the band posing with a small bust of Ludwig van Beethoven (some have mistakenly claimed it is of occultist Aleister Crowley).

Critical reception

In a contemporary review in 1971, music critic Dave Marsh wrote that although the album does indeed contain "thirteen classic songs," it fails to deliver on any purpose other than compiling the most radio-friendly hits in one place. Marsh added that "no magnum opuses" were included in the collection. "No 'The End', no 'When the Music's Over', no 'Soft Parade'... [it] would have been decidedly uncommercial to have them included here... Of course 'Five to One' isn't here; funny thing, outside of 'Unknown Soldier' none of the Doors' more controversial subject matter is included."

Track listing
Details are taken from the 1970 U.S. Elektra album, which lists different songwriter credits than other Doors albums; other releases may show different information.

Personnel
From the 1970 Elektra release:

Musicians
 Jim Morrison – vocals
 Ray Manzarek – piano, organ
 Robby Krieger – guitar
 John Densmore – drums

Production
 Paul A. Rothchild – producer
 Jac Holzman – production supervisor
 Bruce Botnick – engineer

Charts

Certifications

References

Sources

External links

Albums produced by Paul A. Rothchild
The Doors compilation albums
1970 compilation albums
Elektra Records compilation albums
Albums recorded at Sunset Sound Recorders